Yeshiva Rabbi Chaim Berlin or Yeshivas Rabbeinu Chaim Berlin is an American Haredi Lithuanian-type boys' and men's yeshiva in Brooklyn, New York.

Chaim Berlin consists of a preschool, a yeshiva ketana (elementary school), a mesivta (high school), a college-level beth midrash, and Kollel Gur Aryeh, its post-graduate kollel division.

History
The school was established in 1904 as Yeshiva Tiferes Bachurim in Brownsville, Brooklyn, by Jews who moved there from the Lower East Side of New York City, thus making it the oldest yeshiva in Kings County. At the suggestion of Meir Berlin (Bar-Ilan), it was renamed in 1914 for his brother, Chaim Berlin, Chief Rabbi of Moscow and later Jerusalem, and who had also served in Valozhyn, from where several of the yeshiva's founders came.

Chaim Berlin's Mesivta (high school) was, for a while, located in Far Rockaway headed by Shlomo Freifeld.

The yeshiva's Stone & Pitkin (Brownsville) seven story building, formerly known as the Municipal Bank Building, was purchased in 1940; Jacob Rutstein was their major philanthropist.

Leadership

The founding rosh yeshiva, Yaakov Moshe Shurkin, served from 1936 until his death in 1963.Yitzchok Hutner joined the faculty during 1936-1937, and gave monthly lectures as rosh yeshiva from 1943 to 1980. In the late 1970s, a branch was opened in Jerusalem called Yeshiva Pachad Yitzchok (Fear of Isaac).

After Hutner's death, the New York yeshiva was headed by his disciple Aaron Schechter, and the Jerusalem branch was headed by his son-in-law Yonason David.

The position of mashgiach ruchani (spiritual supervisor) has been held by (among others) Avigdor Miller, Shlomo Freifeld, Shlomo Carlebach, and Shimon Groner.

Divisions
Chaim Berlin consists of a preschool, a yeshiva ketana (elementary school), a mesivta (high school), a college-level beth midrash, and Kollel Gur Aryeh, its post-graduate kollel division. Total enrollment for all divisions approaches 2,000 students. The mesivta acts as a feeder school for the beth midrash. 

The yeshiva maintains a summer location, Camp Morris, in Sullivan County, New York. The Yeshiva also runs a summer youth program with the name Chaim Day Camp.

Notable alumni

Notable alumni include many who served in rabbinic capacities throughout the world.

A-M
 Shalom Z. Berger (born 1960), Senior Content Editor of the Koren Talmud Bavli 
 Shlomo Carlebach (1925–2022), former mashgiach ruchani of Yeshiva Rabbi Chaim Berlin
 Shlomo Carlebach (1925–1994), rabbi, religious teacher, spiritual leader, composer, and singer
 Yonasan Dovid David, co-rosh yeshiva of Yeshiva Rabbi Chaim Berlin
 Yaakov Feitman (born 1948), rabbi of Kehillas Bais Yehudah Tzvi, Cedarhurst, New York
 Aharon Feldman (born 1932), rosh yeshiva of Ner Israel Rabbinical College
 Shlomo Freifeld (1925–1990), founding rosh yeshiva of Yeshivas Shor Yoshuv
 David Weiss Halivni (1927–2022), rabbi and professor of Talmud
 David Hartman (1931–2013), American-Israeli rabbi and philosopher of contemporary Judaism, founder of the Shalom Hartman Institute.
 Simcha Krauss (1937–2022), retired rabbi of the Young Israel of Hillcrest, Queens, and leader of the Religious Zionists of America
 David Lefkowitz (1875–1955), chaplain United States Marines
 Aharon Lichtenstein (1933–2015), rosh yeshiva of Yeshivat Har Etzion, Alon Shevut, and rosh kollel of Yeshiva University's Gruss Kollel, Jerusalem

N-Z
 Yaakov Perlow (1931–2020), the Novominsker Rebbe of Borough Park
 Yechiel Perr (born 1935), rosh yeshiva of Yeshiva of Far Rockaway
 Zvi Aryeh Rosenfeld (1922–1978), Polish–American rabbi and educator associated with the Breslov Hasidic movement
 Nota Schiller (born 1937), rosh yeshiva of Ohr Somayach, Jerusalem
 Ahron Soloveichik (1917–2001), taught at Yeshiva University, Hebrew Theological College and Brisk Rabbinical College
 Pinchas Stolper (1931–2022), former Executive Vice-President of the Orthodox Union and founder of NCSY
 Noah Weinberg (1930–2009), co-founder of Yeshivas Ohr Somayach, Jerusalem; founder of Yeshivas Aish HaTorah
 Yaakov Weinberg (1923–1999), rosh yeshiva of Ner Israel Rabbinical College
 Yisroel Eliyahu Weintraub (1932–2010), rabbi

See also
 Yeshiva Torah Vodaath – another yeshiva in Brooklyn
 RIETS

References

External links
 Hagadah of Yeshiva Rabbi Chaim Berlin
 Yeshiva Rabbi Chaim Berlin at Greatschools.org
 Mesivta Rabbi Chaim Berlin
 History of Jewish Brownsville: has section on Chaim Berlin

Educational institutions established in 1904
Flatbush, Brooklyn
Haredi Judaism in New York (state)
Haredi yeshivas
Lithuanian-Jewish culture in New York (state)
Mesivtas
Chaim Berlin
Boys' schools in New York City
1904 establishments in New York City